Richard Demille Wyckoff (November 2, 1873 – March 7, 1934) was an American  stock market investor, and the founder and onetime editor of the Magazine of Wall Street (founding it in 1907). He was also editor of Stock Market Technique.

Research and teachings
Wyckoff implemented his methods of technical analysis of the financial markets (the study of charts showing movements of stock-prices and other data). He grew his wealth such that he eventually owned nine and a half acres and a mansion next door to the Hamptons estate of General Motors president Alfred Sloan in Great Neck, New York.

As Wyckoff became wealthier, he also became altruistic about the public's Wall Street experience. He turned his attention and passion to education, teaching, and in publishing exposés such as “Bucket Shops and How to Avoid Them”, which were run in New York's The Saturday Evening Post starting in 1922.

Continuing as a trader and educator in the stock, commodity and bond markets throughout the early 1900s, Wyckoff was curious about identifying underlying trends or logic behind market action. Through conversations, interviews and research of the successful traders of his time, Wyckoff augmented and documented the methodology he traded and taught. Wyckoff worked with and studied them all, himself, Jesse Livermore, E. H. Harriman, James R. Keene, Otto Kahn, J.P. Morgan, and many other American investors of the day.

Wyckoff's research claimed many common characteristics among the greatest winning stocks and market campaigners of the time. He believed he had analyzed and determined where risk and reward were optimal for trading. He emphasized the placement of stop-losses at all times, the importance of controlling the risk of any particular trade. Wyckoff also has techniques he believed offered advantages when markets were rising or falling (bullish and bearish). The Wyckoff technique may provide some insight as to how and why professional interests buy and sell securities, while evolving and scaling their market campaigns with concepts such as the "Composite Operator".

Wyckoff offered a detailed analysis of the "trading range", a posited ideal price bracket for buying or selling a stock. One tool that  Wyckoff provides is the concept of the composite operator. Simply, Wyckoff felt that an experienced judge of the market should regard larger market trends as the expression of a single mind. He felt that it was an important psychological and tactical advantage to stay in harmony with this omnipotent player.  Wyckoff believed investors would be better prepared to grow their portfolios and net worth by following in his footsteps.

Author

Richard Wyckoff was the author of numerous books. Some of his writings are:

1. Studies in Tape Reading

2. How I Trade and Invest in Stocks and Bonds

3. Stock Market Technique

4. My Secrets of Day Trading in Stocks

5. Jesse Livermore's Methods of Trading in Stocks

Personal life
Wyckoff married three times:  first in 1892 to Elsie Suydam; second to Cecelia G. Shear, and third to Alma Weiss.  Wyckoff charged in 1928 that his second wife,  whom the media dubbed a prima donna of Wall Street, had wrested control of the Magazine of Wall Street from him by "cajolery."  The separation ended in an agreement by which he received half a million dollars of the magazine company's bonds. Wyckoff is an early relative of famed Philadelphia teacher, Madeline Wyckoff.

Death
According to the Brooklyn Daily Eagle newspaper (published Monday March 12, 1934), Wyckoff died on March 7, 1934, in Sacramento, California. His body was taken to a funeral chapel in Brooklyn, New York.

See also
Jay Gould
James Keene
Ralph Nelson Elliott

References

The Richard D. Wyckoff Course in Stock Market Science and Technique, Volume One, Section 9 (1931).
 Pruden, Henry O. Wyckoff by Action Sequence, Golden Gate University, Ageno Business School. San Francisco, California.
 Pruden, Dr. Henry O. and Fraser, Bruce. “The Wyckoff Method Lectures.” The Golden Gate University.  (Fall 1992, Spring 1993).
"The Wyckoff family in America : a genealogy," Part II, page 375.  Published by The Wyckoff Association of America, 1950.
 Time - The Weekly Magazine.  Volume XII, Number 24. December 10, 1928.
 Time - The Weekly Magazine.  Volume XIII, Number 5.  February 4, 1929.
 Time - The Weekly Magazine.  Volume XXIII, Number 12.  May. 9, 1932.
 Wyckoff, Richard D. How I Trade and Invest in Stocks and Bonds. 1922, with subsequent editions through 1926.
 ---. Stock Market Techniques - Number One. 1933.
 ---. Stock Market Techniques - Number Two. 1934.
 ---. Wall Street Ventures and Adventures Through Forty Years. 1930.
 Brooklyn Daily Eagle (1934). Deaths. p.15.

External Links

Official website

1934 deaths
American money managers
Technical analysts
Wyckoff family
1873 births
American male writers